James Pond and the Deathly Shallows is a 2011 video game released for the iPhone, iPod and iPad iOS service, developed and published by HPN Associates.   It is the fifth game in the series and the first James Pond title to be released for the franchise in eighteen years. The title is a pun based on Harry Potter and the Deathly Hallows.

Reception
Reception to the game has been largely negative. Jim Sterling of Destructoid.com scored Deathly Shallows "1 out of 10" saying: "It is clear that those behind the game know what a useless waste of time it is, and awkwardly glued the James Pond name to it [in] order to con fans". They placed it in 2nd place on their list of the worst games of 2011.

References

2011 video games
IOS games
IOS-only games
James Pond
Video game sequels
Video games developed in the United Kingdom
Platform games
Video games with underwater settings